In physics, the Kondo effect describes the scattering of conduction electrons in a metal due to magnetic impurities, resulting in a characteristic change i.e. a minimum in electrical resistivity with temperature.
The cause of the effect was first explained by Jun Kondo, who applied third-order perturbation theory to the problem to account for scattering of s-orbital conduction electrons off d-orbital electrons localized at impurities (Kondo model). Kondo's calculation predicted that the scattering rate and the resulting part of the resistivity should increase logarithmically as the temperature approaches 0 K. Experiments in the 1960s by Myriam Sarachik at Bell Laboratories provided the first data that confirmed the Kondo effect. Extended to a lattice of magnetic impurities, the Kondo effect likely explains the formation of heavy fermions and Kondo insulators in intermetallic compounds, especially those involving rare earth elements such as cerium, praseodymium, and ytterbium, and actinide elements such as uranium. The Kondo effect has also been observed in quantum dot systems.

Theory
The dependence of the resistivity  on temperature , including the Kondo effect, is written as

Jun Kondo derived the third term with logarithmic dependence on temperature and the experimentally observed concentration dependence.

Background
Kondo's solution was derived using perturbation theory resulting in a divergence as the temperature approaches 0 K, but later methods used non-perturbative techniques to refine his result. These improvements produced a finite resistivity but retained the feature of a resistance minimum at a non-zero temperature. One defines the Kondo temperature as the energy scale limiting the validity of the Kondo results. The Anderson impurity model and accompanying Wilsonian renormalization theory were an important contribution to understanding the underlying physics of the problem. Based on the Schrieffer–Wolff transformation, it was shown that the Kondo model lies in the strong coupling regime of the Anderson impurity model. The Schrieffer–Wolff transformation projects out the high energy charge excitations in the Anderson impurity model, obtaining the Kondo model as an effective Hamiltonian.

The Kondo effect can be considered as an example of asymptotic freedom, i.e. a situation where the coupling becomes non-perturbatively strong at low temperatures and low energies. In the Kondo problem, the coupling refers to the interaction between the localized magnetic impurities and the itinerant electrons.

Examples 
Extended to a lattice of magnetic ions, the Kondo effect likely explains the formation of heavy fermions and Kondo insulators in intermetallic compounds, especially those involving rare earth elements such as cerium, praseodymium, and ytterbium, and actinide elements such as uranium. In heavy fermion materials, the non-perturbative growth of the interaction leads to quasi-electrons with masses up to thousands of times the free electron mass, i.e., the electrons are dramatically slowed by the interactions. In a number of instances they are superconductors. It is believed that a manifestation of the Kondo effect is necessary for understanding the unusual metallic delta-phase of plutonium.

The Kondo effect has been observed in quantum dot systems. In such systems, a quantum dot with at least one unpaired electron behaves as a magnetic impurity, and when the dot is coupled to a metallic conduction band, the conduction electrons can scatter off the dot. This is completely analogous to the more traditional case of a magnetic impurity in a metal.

Band-structure hybridization and flat band topology in Kondo insulators have been imaged in angle-resolved photoemission spectroscopy experiments.

In 2012, Beri and Cooper proposed a topological Kondo effect could be found with Majorana fermions, while it has been shown that quantum simulations with ultracold atoms may also demonstrate the effect.

In 2017, teams from the Vienna University of Technology and Rice University conducted experiments into the development of new materials made from the metals cerium, bismuth and palladium in specific combinations and theoretical work experimenting with models of such structures, respectively. The results of the experiments were published in December 2017 and, together with the theoretical work, lead to the discovery of a new state, a correlation-driven Weyl semimetal. The team dubbed this new quantum material Weyl-Kondo semimetal.

References

External links
Kondo Effect - 40 Years after the Discovery - special issue of the Journal of the Physical Society of Japan
The Kondo Problem to Heavy Fermions - Monograph on the Kondo effect by A.C. Hewson
Exotic Kondo Effects in Metals - Monograph on newer versions of the Kondo effect in non-magnetic contexts especially
Correlated electrons in δ-plutonium within a dynamical mean-field picture, Nature 410, 793 (2001). Nature article exploring the links of the Kondo effect and plutonium

Electrical resistance and conductance
Correlated electrons
Electric and magnetic fields in matter
Physical phenomena